Middle Park is a light rail station on the former St Kilda railway line, located in the Melbourne suburb of Middle Park. It is located on the corner of Canterbury Road and Armstrong Street. A pair of low-level side platforms now serve route 96 trams on a light rail line. Other nearby light rail stops are at Fraser Street and Wright Street. Those and other stops were added after the line was converted to light rail.

History
Middle Park station opened in 1883, well after the line through it opened in 1857. The St Kilda railway line closed in 1987, and was converted to light rail, with the route 96 tram now running past the former station. The last train service ran on 31 July 1987, and the light rail service was officially commissioned on 21 November of that year. The high-level platforms used by trains were demolished to make way for the construction of lower-level platforms, but the station building remained at the original level.

In 2006, the building was redeveloped as a café called Mart 130, but it was gutted by fire on 19 February 2018, and later demolished. It has since been rebuilt and, houses the For Change Co. café It was not the first time fire has destroyed the station: a fire in July 1978 also destroyed the station.

Tram services
Yarra Trams operates one route via Middle Park station:
 : East Brunswick – St Kilda Beach

References

Disused railway stations in Melbourne
Railway stations in Australia opened in 1883
Railway stations closed in 1987
1987 disestablishments in Australia
Tram stops in Melbourne
Buildings and structures in the City of Port Phillip
Transport in the City of Port Phillip